Darren Fung is a Canadian film and television composer based in Los Angeles. He is best known for scoring The Great Human Odyssey, Equus: Story of the Horse, Bang Bang Baby, and Canada AM.

Life and career
Darren was born in Edmonton, Alberta and is a graduate of McGill University. He was responsible for rearranging and producing the Hockey Theme, often referred to as Canada's second national anthem, for NHL on TSN. His work on Niobe Thompson’s The Great Human Odyssey and Equus: Story of the Horse received critical acclaim and has been presented live in-concert with orchestras across Canada with Darren conducting.

As an arranger and orchestrator, Darren has written numerous orchestral arrangements for Canadian artists including iskwē and Shawnee Kish. He is a long-time board member of the Screen Composers Guild of Canada, and a mentor for the Canadian Film Centre’s Slaight Family Music Lab.

Selected filmography

 2021 – Bee's Diary
 2021 – Cinema of Sleep
 2020 – A Sugar & Spice Holiday
 2019 – We Happy Few: Roger & James In They Came From Below
 2018 – Abandoned: Angelique's Isle
 2018 – Equus: Story of The Horse
 2017 – Union Leader

 2016 – The Great Human Odyssey: Rise of a Species
 2015 – The Making of Une Libération
 2014 – Danny
 2014 – Bang Bang Baby
 2011 – Lost Years: A People's Struggle for Justice
 2007 – Just Buried

Awards and nominations

References

External links

21st-century Canadian composers
Canadian film score composers
Canadian television composers
Canadian Screen Award winners
Living people
Year of birth missing (living people)